Jimera de Líbar is a town and municipality in the province of Málaga, part of the autonomous community of Andalusia in southern Spain. The municipality is situated approximately 26 kilometres from Ronda and sits at an altitude of 540 metres. It is located in the west of the province.  It belongs to the comarca of Serranía de Ronda. It has a population of approximately 450 residents. The natives are called Jimeranos.

The village is quiet and has an elderly population whereas the livelier station has plenty of weekend visitors who come to enjoy the peaceful nature of the area. 4 trains from each direction stop here every day. The train station was built in a typical English style.

References

External links
 Jimera de Libar website - in Spanish

Municipalities in the Province of Málaga